Domingo "Roy" Granata (Buenos Aires, 12 February 1922 - Buenos Aires, 19 August 2005) was an Argentine jazz musician.

Biography
Granata was the second child of Giuseppino Granata and Lucía Russo. He began his musical studies when he was very young and, by the time he reached his teens, was teaching theory, voice, composition, piano, violin and trumpet, the last of which would become his instrument of choice.

Upon entering military service, he formed the "Banda de Granaderos" (Grenadiers). After his tour of duty, he spent his nights working for various orchestras in Buenos Aires.  In 1954, he took a job in Medellín. He, his wife and newborn child lived there for two years, but they became homesick and returned to Buenos Aires, where Roy formed his own orchestra, the "Banda de Estrellas", which played jazz as well as an array of Latin-American musical styles. In the sixties, he was a featured artist in the band "Cafiaspirina". It was then that he was first presented as "Roy Granata y su Trompeta de Oro" (Trumpet of Gold).

In 1969, he helped organize the Primer Festival Nacional de la Música Beat which was held in the theater "El Nacional" and included most of the best-known bands in Argentina. They were awarded prizes for playing, style and execution by a jury of prominent figures from the public, academic and commercial spheres.

At the beginning of the seventies, he traveled to Aruba and decided to stay for a few years. In the later seventies and eighties he was part of several theater orchestras in Buenos Aires, until they replaced the musicians with recordings to save money. But, even though he no longer performed live, he continued to arrange music for many bands and orchestras.

References

External links
Mercado Libre: Sheet music for "Mon Amour", showing Granata and singer Carlos Lecube

1922 births
2005 deaths
Argentine musicians
Argentine people of Italian descent
Argentine expatriates in Colombia
Expatriates in Aruba